Pomaderris grandis, commonly known as large pomaderris, is a species of flowering plant in the family Rhamnaceae and is endemic to a restricted part of the south-west of Western Australia. It grows in rocky gullies on the slopes of Mount Manypeaks in the Esperance Plains biogeographic region of south-western Western Australia. The species was first formally described in 1862 by Ferdinand von Mueller in his Fragmenta Phytographiae Australiae. It is listed as "Priority Four" by the Government of Western Australia Department of Biodiversity, Conservation and Attractions, meaning that it is rare or near threatened.

References

Flora of Western Australia
grandis
Plants described in 1862
Taxa named by Ferdinand von Mueller